Hyde End is a small hamlet in Berkshire, England, and part of the civil parish of Brimpton.

Hyde End House is a Grade II listed building, built around 1800.

References

Hamlets in Berkshire
West Berkshire District